Berezovka Air Base (also Umbozero South) is a former air base in Murmansk Oblast, Russia located 13 km southwest of Umbozero. It contained few facilities and no buildings identifiable on satellite imagery, and was likely intended for use as a forward bomber staging base during the height of the Cold War.

References

External links
 Abandoned & Little-Known Airfields:
 Khariusny Airfield

Buildings and structures in Murmansk Oblast

Soviet Long Range Aviation Arctic staging bases